Reviga is a commune located in Ialomița County, Muntenia, Romania. It is composed of four villages: Crunți, Mircea cel Bătrân, Reviga and Rovine.

References

Communes in Ialomița County
Localities in Muntenia